Wolverhampton East was a parliamentary constituency in the town of Wolverhampton in Staffordshire, England.  It returned one Member of Parliament (MP)  to the House of Commons of the Parliament of the United Kingdom.

History

The constituency was created by the Redistribution of Seats Act 1885 for the 1885 general election, when the former two-seat Wolverhampton constituency was divided into three single-member constituencies.

It was abolished for the 1950 general election.

Boundaries 
1885–1918: The Borough of Wolverhampton wards of St James's, St Mary's, and St Peter's, and the parishes of Wednesfield and Willenhall.

1918–1950: The County Borough of Wolverhampton wards of St James's, St Mary's, and St Peter's, and the Urban Districts of Short Heath, Wednesfield, Wednesfield Heath, and Willenhall.

Members of Parliament

Election results

Elections in the 1880s

Elections in the 1890s 

Fowler was appointed President of the Local Government Board, requiring a by-election.

*some sources describe as Liberal Unionist

Elections in the 1900s

Elections in the 1910s 

General Election 1914–15:

Another General Election was required to take place before the end of 1915. The political parties had been making preparations for an election to take place and by the July 1914, the following candidates had been selected; 
Liberal: George Thorne
Unionist: Ivor Windsor-Clive

Elections in the 1920s

Elections in the 1930s

Elections in the 1940s 
A General election was due to take place before the end of 1940, but was postponed due to the Second World War. By 1939, the following candidates had been selected to contest this constituency;
Liberal: Geoffrey Mander
Conservative:

See also
List of Members of Parliament for Wolverhampton
List of parliamentary constituencies in Wolverhampton

References 

Parliamentary constituencies in Wolverhampton
Parliamentary constituencies in the West Midlands (county) (historic)
Parliamentary constituencies in Staffordshire (historic)
Constituencies of the Parliament of the United Kingdom established in 1885
Constituencies of the Parliament of the United Kingdom disestablished in 1950